The Avion is a prototype sportscar that achieves over 100 MPG. The Avion car is based on a simple concept: fuel economy is largely determined by aerodynamic drag and vehicle weight.  The Avion uses existing automotive components, an existing high-efficiency automotive diesel engine and marries them to a lightweight aluminum frame and highly aerodynamic composite body. The Avion was an official contender in the Progressive Insurance Automotive X Prize.

History 

The Avion was developed in 1979 by Craig Henderson and Bill Green after graduating from Western Washington University in Bellingham, Washington where they had worked at the Vehicle Research Institute. The prototype was completed in 1984 and set the Guinness world record for fuel economy in 1986 at 103.7 mpg.

The plan, at the time the car was designed, was to manufacture the Avion in limited quantities and sell into the car enthusiast market.  But the real price of gasoline fell steadily from 1979 through the 1980s  and interest in highly fuel-efficient cars disappeared along with the interest of potential investors. 

The dramatic increase in real fuel prices from 2000 to 2008 has renewed interest in automobile fuel economy. The original Avion was taken out of storage and an updated version was entered in the Progressive Automotive X Prize competition.

Vehicle 

The car was designed to be manufactured in small volume using existing automotive components, including a small automotive diesel engine.  A lightweight composite body of highly aerodynamic design is attached to an aluminum frame, and features Butterfly doors.

Notes

External links 
 The official Avion site
 Bellingham Herald article
 New York Times blog article
 Sept. 2010 Wired Autotopia piece

Green vehicles